Smithfield Township  is the name of several places in the United States:

 Smithfield Township, DeKalb County, Indiana
 Smithfield Township, Fayette County, Iowa
 Smithfield Township, Johnston County, North Carolina
 Smithfield Township, Jefferson County, Ohio
 Smithfield Township, Bradford County, Pennsylvania
 Smithfield Township, Huntingdon County, Pennsylvania
 Smithfield Township, Monroe County, Pennsylvania
 and also: Middle Smithfield Township, Monroe County, Pennsylvania

See also
 Smithfield (disambiguation)
 

Township name disambiguation pages